Aslanbek Dzitiyev (born 27 August 1982) is a Russian taekwondo practitioner. He competed in the men's 68 kg event at the 2000 Summer Olympics.

References

1982 births
Living people
Russian male taekwondo practitioners
Olympic taekwondo practitioners of Russia
Taekwondo practitioners at the 2000 Summer Olympics
People from Vladikavkaz
Sportspeople from Vladikavkaz
20th-century Russian people
21st-century Russian people